was a Japanese era name (年号, nengō, "year name") after Bunmei and before Entoku. This period spanned the years from July 1487 through August 1489. The reigning emperor was Go-Tsuchimikado-tennō (後土御門天皇).

Change of era
 1487 : The era name was changed to mark an event or a number of events. The old era ended and a new one commenced in Bunmei 19.

Events of the Chōkyō era
 1487 (Chōkyō 1): Takatskasa-no Masahira was replaced as kampaku by the former naidaijin Kiyosho-no Masatada.
 1487 (Chōkyō 1, 8th month): Udaijin Ōe-no mikado Nobukatsu died at age 42.
 1487 (Chōkyō 1, 8th month): Shōgun Yoshihisa led a large army against Rokkaku Takayori (also known as Rokkaku Tobatsu), the daimyō of southern Ōmi Province.

Notes

References
 Nussbaum, Louis Frédéric and Käthe Roth. (2005). Japan Encyclopedia. Cambridge: Harvard University Press. ; OCLC 48943301
 Titsingh, Isaac. (1834). Nihon Ōdai Ichiran; ou,  Annales des empereurs du Japon.  Paris: Royal Asiatic Society, Oriental Translation Fund of Great Britain and Ireland. OCLC 5850691

External links
 National Diet Library, "The Japanese Calendar" – historical overview plus illustrative images from library's collection

Japanese eras
1480s in Japan